The Take Off TBM 11 is an aircraft engine, designed and produced by Take Off GmbH of Hamm, Germany, for use in ultralight and homebuilt aircraft.

Design and development 
The TBM 11 engine is a twin-cylinder four-stroke, horizontally-opposed,  displacement, air-oil-cooled, gasoline engine design, with a clutch and damper reduction drive with reduction ratios of 3.55:1, 3.2:1 and 2.8:1. It employs dual electronic ignition and produces  at 7100 rpm, with a compression ratio of 11.5.

The engine is based upon a BMW motorcycle engine design.

The engine specifications carry a manufacturer's warning that the engine has not been tested, nor is certified for aircraft use, and that neither BMW nor Take Off accept any liability for aircraft use or consequential damages.

Specifications (TBM 11)

See also

References

External links 

Take Off aircraft engines
Air-cooled aircraft piston engines
2000s aircraft piston engines